Kabua Morea (born 30 September 1993) is a Papua New Guinean cricketer. Morea was named in Papua New Guinea's squads for the 2012 Under-19 Cricket World Cup and the 2014 Under-19 Cricket World Cup. He also represented Papua New Guinea in the men's cricket tournament at the 2015 Pacific Games, finishing the tournament as Papua New Guinea's leading wicket-taker with twelve dismissals.

In August 2021, he was named in Papua New Guinea's One Day International (ODI) squad for their series against Nepal and the United States in Oman, and their squad for round seven of the 2019–2023 ICC Cricket World Cup League 2 tournament, also in Oman. Later the same month, he was also named in Papua New Guinea's squad for the 2021 ICC Men's T20 World Cup. He made his ODI debut on 10 September 2021, for Papua New Guinea against Nepal. The following month, in round seven of the 2019–2023 ICC Cricket World Cup League 2 tournament, Morea took his first five-wicket haul in ODI cricket, with 5 for 28 against Oman. He made his Twenty20 International (T20I) debut on 8 October 2021, for Papua New Guinea against Scotland in the 2021 Summer T20 Bash.

References

External links
 

1993 births
Living people
Papua New Guinean cricketers
Papua New Guinea One Day International cricketers
Papua New Guinea Twenty20 International cricketers
Place of birth missing (living people)